The  4 × 2.5 kilometre mixed relay competition of the 2014 Winter Paralympics was held at Laura Biathlon & Ski Complex near Krasnaya Polyana, Sochi. The competition took place on 15 March 2014

Results

See also
Cross-country skiing at the 2014 Winter Olympics

References

4 x 2.5 kilometre mixed relay